Peter Pucher (born August 12, 1974 in Prešov, Czechoslovakia) is a Slovak professional ice hockey forward. He currently plays for Orli Znojmo in the Austrian Hockey League (EBEL). He returned to Znojmo after a season in the Slovak Extraliga with HKm Zvolen in 2010–11.

Career statistics

Regular season and playoffs

International

References

External links

1974 births
HC Košice players
HC Kometa Brno players
Orli Znojmo players
HC Dynamo Pardubice players
HKM Zvolen players
Living people
Sportspeople from Prešov
Slovak ice hockey forwards
Olympic ice hockey players of Slovakia
Ice hockey players at the 1998 Winter Olympics
Slovak expatriate ice hockey players in the Czech Republic